The Robert G. Dick Memorial Stakes is a Grade III American Thoroughbred horse race for fillies and mares age three and older run over a distance of  miles on the turf held annually in July at Delaware Park in Stanton, Delaware.

History 

The event was inaugurated on 9 November 1997 as the Robert G. Dick Memorial Handicap and was won by Double Stake who led all the way in a time of 1:52 on a muddy dirt track for the  mile distance. The event is named after  the former chairman of the Delaware Thoroughbred Racing Commission and who served in the capacity of commissioner for 18 years and chairman of that body from 1990 until his retirement in 1993.

Since 1998 the event has been held on the turf track except in 2013 when inclement weather moved the event to the dirt track. 

The event was classified as Grade III in 2008 and has held this class since except in 2013 when the event was held on the dirt track.

Between 1999 and 2007 the event include Breeders' Cup incentives which were reflected in the name of the event.

Records
Speed record: 
  miles: 2:12.82  - Tricky Escape  (2018)

Margins: 
  lengths –  Honey Ryder  (2005)

Most wins:
  2 - Gentle Ruler  (2019, 2020)
  2 - Honey Ryder   (2004, 2005)
  2 - Alternate (2002, 2003)

Most wins by an owner:
 2 - Pin Oak Stable  (2002, 2003)
 2 - Glencrest Farm  (2004, 2005)
 2 - Morsches Stable  (2019, 2020)

Most wins by a jockey:
 4 - Edgar S. Prado   (1999, 2005, 2012, 2016)

Most wins by a trainer:
 8 - H. Graham Motion (1999, 2002, 2003, 2004, 2007, 2009, 2016, 2017)

Winners

Legend:

See also
 List of American and Canadian Graded races

References

Graded stakes races in the United States
Recurring sporting events established in 1997
1997 establishments in Delaware
Grade 3 stakes races in the United States
Middle distance horse races for fillies and mares